In American law enforcement (municipal, county, or state), the Emergency Service Unit, or ESU, is a multi-faceted element within a law enforcement agency’s Special Operations Command.

Structure
The NYPD is credited with establishing the concept of a police emergency squad, as ESU is also synonymous with the term Emergency Services Squad (ESS) and Emergency Service Detail (ESD). An ESU operates at the direction of the command staff and responds to emergency and high-risk situations that occur outside the scope of duties of responding patrol and criminal investigation units. ESU members train continually both in-house, with other local, state, federal and military specialized units and sometimes members of a Federal Emergency Management Agency (FEMA) Urban Search & Rescue (USAR) Team.

Duties
An ESU often provides services analogous to the functions of a Special Weapons and Tactics (SWAT) team. ESUs respond to high-risk, tactical operations involving barricaded suspects, hostage situations, high-risk warrant service, tactical crowd control and dignitary/VIP protective operations. ESUs also provide operations and technician level response to hazardous materials (HAZMAT) incidents involving the presence of industrial or illicit chemical, biological or radiological agents involving criminals or terrorists. The ESU responds to rescue victims from structural collapse, high-rise structure, confined spaces, trench collapse, vehicle and rail car accident, and machinery accident entrapment. They may also respond to persons having difficulty breathing, heart attacks, and strokes as first respondents, or along with local EMS.

Many ESUs also perform both surface and underwater victim rescue, searches and evidence recovery as well as to provide "crisis response" to incidents involving psychologically disturbed individuals. ESU members sometimes provide immediate fire suppression and victim rescue for fires occurring in massive and highly populated structural locations that are under the direct jurisdiction of a state or municipal authority. ESUs' operations are often supported by a Canine (K-9) response capability and members often respond to incidents involving dangerous animals and reptiles. In some jurisdictions, ESU members may provide medical support and team member rescue during tactical operations and sometimes staff a dedicated ambulance.

Training
Law enforcement agency ESU members must maintain the highest level of physical agility and personal health at all times in order to meet the crisis challenges of tactical situations. ESU officers usually have at least five-(5) years experience as a patrol officer before being appointed to an ESU assignment. Then the candidate usually completes a minimum of eight months of  specialized technical rescue training in the arenas of medical first respondent or EMT training/certification, fire suppression, vehicle and machinery victim extrication, swift water rescue, structural collapse rescue, high and low-angle tactical rope rescue, confined space rescue, trench rescue and water rescue.

ESU members' tactical SWAT training includes the use of irritant chemical agents, HAZMAT personal protective equipment (PPE), victim technical rescue equipment, forcible entry techniques, elevator rescue, HAZMAT detection instruments, HAZMAT decontamination, dangerous animal and reptile management, defensive electronic immobilization shields, barricade response, tactical formations, and the use of a myriad of both semi-automatic and fully automatic firearms. ESU members are usually cross-trained and maintain both State and National certifications as a Medical First Responder, Emergency Medical Technician (EMT) or Paramedic and sometimes as a Psychological Services Technician (PST). ESU members may also be trained at the National Firefighter 1 level to provide initial response and fire suppression within massive and highly populated fixed structural locations.

Equipment
ESU equipment can include: vehicle extrication tools, high-angle and low-angle rope and victim rescue equipment, SCUBA, forcible entry tools, lighting equipment, irritant chemical agents, HAZMAT detection instruments, HAZMAT PPE, HAZMAT decontamination, pneumatic breaching tools, self-contained breathing apparatus (SCBA), water rescue gear, animal control tools, semi- and fully automatic firearms, and ballistic gear, portable cutting and hand tools, high-energy hydraulic rescue tools, metal detectors, climbing gear, body bunker ballistic shields, portable field lighting, small marine craft, fire-fighter protective clothing, ballistic body armor and shields, basic life support (BLS) or advanced life support (ALS) equipment, as well as additional medical equipment.

Response vehicles
ESU utilizes smaller patrol response vehicles which are supported by larger utility "rescue squad" type trucks. Smaller patrol ESU response vehicles can range from an SUV to a light or medium duty truck or van with a rear-mounted utility body. Larger ESU vehicles can range from a medium duty chassis to a heavy duty "squad" utility body mounted on a commercial chassis. Other ESU support vehicles can include one or more ambulances, wheeled or tracked armored vehicle, portable light towers/generators up to 100 kW, emergency support vehicles which contain inflatable marine watercraft or massive inflatable airbags.

Non-law enforcement ESUs
ESUs also exist as a non-law enforcement agency based municipal, county or non-government entity and may exist as both career and volunteer groups which are located in urban, rural and remote areas. Non-law enforcement ESUs provide temporary emergency response to incidents during major public events to support the jurisdictions primary 911 EMS, fire and rescue service. ESUs also provide tactical emergency medical support, rescue of confined space victims, wildland/urban interface initial fire suppression, underwater rescue/recovery, high angle rope rescue, wildland search & rescue (SAR), auto accidents victim rescue, building collapses. In rural areas, ESUs perform suppression of wildland forest, brush and grass fires that occur, cliff and mountain search and rescue, underwater search and rescue, swift water and flood rescue operations. The key rationale for the integration of the functions is that many rural and remote communities do not have dedicated staffing, resources and infrastructure to sustain immediate 24/7 emergency response. A local ESU may exist to mainly provide emergency training such as CPR/AED, first aid, 1st responder, etc. to citizens, communities, OSHA work site and to marine/boating. This mobile training capability uses a light-duty emergency vehicle that is fully equipped with a basic life support (BLS) responder medical, wildland/urban interface firefighting system, powered hydraulic and air bag rescue systems, self-contained breathing apparatus and protective fire gear and other equipment and, when requested, can support the local emergency response system as a rapid intervention vehicle. A state or local public health Emergency Services Unit manages the Department’s emergency supplies, supporting technologies used during disasters, and helps fulfill the National and state Emergency Support Function (ESF) #8 Health & Medical Services and ESF #6 Mass Care & Sheltering needs of community citizens during a major emergency or disaster. Local chapters of the American Red Cross often maintain an Emergency Services Unit to provide disaster relief assistance to individuals and families affected by local disasters at fires and local disaster shelters as well as mobile emergency response vehicles (ERV)/ mobile canteens. Scores of our Nation's hospitals and medical centers use Emergency Services Unit to denote their specific organizational section that encompasses their emergency department (ED), Hospital Emergency Incident Management System (HEICS)-Emergency Coordination Center (ECC) and/or their "First Receiver" outside patient decontamination system, and sometimes includes a hospital operated emergency medical service (EMS) paramedic ambulance program. An Emergency Services Unit can also often denote a government or non-government entity emergency mental health or family crisis intervention team.

Criticism
Critics claim that the increasing number of ESU and SWAT indicates that the police in the United States are becoming increasingly "militarized". Among the critics is journalist and political analyst at the Cato Institute, Radley Balko, who has written several books and articles on the subject.

NYPD

The New York City Police Department Emergency Service Unit is the largest ESU with over 500 personnel. ESU and the Canine Unit provide specialized equipment, expertise and support to the various units within the New York City Police Department. From auto accidents to building collapses to hostage situations, "ESU" officers are called on when the situation requires advanced equipment and expertise. The Canine Unit provides assistance during searches for missing persons, perpetrators and evidence. Fourteen of the twenty-three NYPD officers who died on September 11th, 2001 were from ESU.

PAPD
The Port Authority of New York and New Jersey Police Department Emergency Services Unit was founded in 1983, over the objections of the Port Authority Police management at that time. Working with the non-police PATH railroad personnel and railroad management, who clearly recognized the need for a rapid response to PATH railroad emergencies and fires, a small group of Port Authority Police officers assigned to the PATH command asked for, and got, a stock Port Authority utility truck which was converted for police emergency use. Despite the continued objections of Port Authority police management, the PATH railroad management's goal of having an "Emergency Response Vehicle" operated by the police bore fruit. The initial team members were trained in underground rescue, extrication of passengers from PATH train cars and first aid, with emphasis on the procedure of lifting railroad cars from trapped persons by use of Vetter air bags. Prior to the PATH Emergency Unit, emergencies which occurred on the PATH train were handled by the local police within the jurisdictions around the PATH train (Jersey City, New York, Newark, etc.).

Emergency Services Unit members, who have received specialized training to respond to emergency and rescue operations that arise at Port Authority facilities or in other jurisdictions when their expertise is requested are currently assigned to various facilities throughout the Port Authority. Emergency Services Unit members may receive training in animal control, hazardous material response, heavy weapon use, bridge and water rescue, and tactical operations. Noteworthy cases that the Emergency Services Unit has handled or assisted other jurisdictions in handling include:

 The collapse of the World Trade Center on September 11, 2001
 The 1993 World Trade Center bombing 
 The rescue of an emotionally disturbed person from a water tower in West New York, New Jersey 
 A 1999 General Aviation crash in the City of Newark
 The rescue of homeowners in Bound Brook, New Jersey trapped by rising floodwaters caused by Hurricane Floyd in 1999 
 A ceiling collapse at the Journal Square Transportation Center
 Water rescues from the PATH system in 1992 
 A NJ Transit train accident in the Hackensack Meadowlands in 1996
 Assisting with rescue operations on the Hudson River US Airways Flight 1549
 A NJ Transit train accident at the Hoboken Train Station in 2016

References
E-Man: Life in the NYPD Emergency Services Unit (Paperback) by Jerry Schmetterer and Al Sheppard  [Out of print]

Law enforcement in the United States
Emergency services in the United States